The Centre for Health and International Relations (CHAIR) was founded (2003) in the belief that there are compelling reasons for linking international relations, foreign policy, security and health. CHAIR is based in the Department of International Politics, Aberystwyth University, Aberystwyth, Wales. The founder and director is Professor Colin McInnes.

Research areas 
In addition to research into the global politics of health broadly defined, CHAIR is also involved in research in the following areas:
 Global health governance, particularly the role of international organisations in generating what are often inchoate responses to health crises. In this context, CHAIR embarked on a major, European Research Council-funded project in 2009 entitled 'The Transformation of Global Health Governance: Competing World Views and Crises', in association with the Centre on Global Change and Health at the London School of Hygiene and Tropical Medicine.
 Politics and securitization of infectious disease, especially HIV/AIDS.
 Role of the World Health Organization and International Health Regulations in the global governance of health.
 Inter-relationship of health, peace, and conflict.
 The issue of access to medicine.

Staff 
 Professor Colin McInnes – Director
 Dr Simon Rushton – Research Fellow
 Dr Owain David Williams – Research Fellow
 Dr Marie Woodling
 Dr Rachel J. Owen
 Hannah Hughes
 Sonja Kittelsen

Associated staff working on the ongoing 'The Transformation of Global Health Governance: Competing World Views and Crises' project from the London School of Hygiene and Tropical Medicine:
 Professor Kelley Lee
 Dr Adam Kamradt-Scott
 Dr David Reubi

References

External links
 Centre for Health and International Relations, Aberystwyth University
 Centre on Global Change and Health, London School of Hygiene and Tropical Medicine
 European Research Council
 World Health Organization

Research institutes in Wales
Research institutes in the United Kingdom
International medical and health organizations
Medical and health organisations based in Wales
Political research institutes